Harold Andrés Gómez Muñoz (born 21 April 1992) is a Colombian professional footballer who plays for Deportivo Cali, as a right back.

References

1992 births
Living people
Colombian footballers
Categoría Primera A players
Deportivo Cali footballers
Once Caldas footballers
Uniautónoma F.C. footballers
Cúcuta Deportivo footballers
Deportivo Pasto footballers
Deportivo Pereira footballers
Atlético Bucaramanga footballers
Footballers from Cali
Association football fullbacks